Henry Ward Wright (March 4, 1868 – August 19, 1948) was an American politician who served in the California State Assembly and as Speaker of the Assembly.

Early life and education

On March 4, 1868, Henry W. Wright was born near Ionia, Iowa in Chickasaw County, Iowa to Methodists. He graduated from Iowa State College and Omaha Commercial College.

Career 
Wright held a minor office in Minnesota until he moved to California in 1905.

During the 1912 presidential election he joined Thedore Roosevelt's Progressive Party and was elected to the state assembly in 1914. From 1915 to 1921 he served in the California State Assembly and on was selected as Speaker of the California State Assembly by acclamation on January 6, 1919. When the United States entered World War I he was appointed to a district draft board. He was elected to the Los Angeles County Board of Supervisors in 1921 and served until he was defeated by Roger W. Jessup in 1932.

On March 30, 1926, he announced that he would run for the Republican nomination in the ninth congressional district for the 1926 election, but came in last with 10.19% of the vote behind William E. Evans, Charles Hiram Randall, and Harold B. Landreth.

On August 18, 1948, Wright died at Huntington Hospital in Pasadena, California.

Electoral history

References

External links
Join California Henry W. Wright

1868 births
1948 deaths
Methodists from California
People from Chickasaw County, Iowa
Speakers of the California State Assembly
Republican Party members of the California State Assembly
Los Angeles County Board of Supervisors
20th-century American politicians
Methodists from Iowa